Rillington Place is a three-part biographical crime drama about the real life case of serial killer John Christie, and the subsequent wrongful execution of Timothy Evans.  It premiered on 29 November 2016 on BBC One.

Premise
The miniseries revolves around the home life of John Christie and his wife, Ethel, as he commits a string of murders during the 1940s and early 1950s.  Each of the three episodes tells the story as seen from the respective point of view of the three main characters: Ethel, Timothy Evans and John Christie.

Cast
 Tim Roth as John Christie
 Samantha Morton as Ethel Christie
 Nico Mirallegro as Timothy Evans
 Jodie Comer as Beryl Evans

Broadcast and reception
On 29 November 2016, the first episode premiered on BBC One, to largely positive reviews from critics, who applauded the performances and the storytelling. However, it also attracted mixed reactions from some viewers who complained about the "mumbling" and the "inaudible dialogue" of the actors.

Following the second episode on 6 December, Sarah Doran of RadioTimes.com noted that several viewers had been confused by Mirallegro's use of two different accents while portraying Evans, as the actor switched between Cockney and Welsh accents. However, writers Ed Whitmore and Tracey Malon told the website this had been deliberate, since it was a trait adopted by Evans himself in an attempt to fit into his surroundings: "Tim moved to London from Wales around the age of eleven, his half-sister told us he was very keen to fit in and soon adopted a London 'barrow-boy' accent, but that he could slip back into his childhood accent when around members of his Welsh family. Nico [Mirallegro] wanted to reflect Tim's malleability and that desire to fit in by using different accents according to who he was talking to."

Internationally, the series premiered on BBC First on 8 February 2017.

Production
As Rillington Place no longer exists (it was demolished in the early 1970s) the interiors of 10 Rillington Place were recreated at BBC Scotland’s Dumbarton Studios near Glasgow, whilst the exteriors of the street were shot on a set created in a parking lot at the same studio, though the exterior set of Rillington Place is scaled down with just eight houses recreated, (four on either side of the exterior set).

Other locations across Scotland were used to represent London. The Bo'ness & Kinneil Railway for the railway station and train, New Street in Paisley, West Princes Street and West Street in Glasgow, representing the link between Rillington Place and the rest of Ladbroke Grove in London. Filming also made use of the Western Baths Club. The Ballantine Castings Factory in Bo'ness was used for the bombed-out section of the factory at the end of Rillington Place.

References

External links
 
 

2016 British television series debuts
2016 British television series endings
2010s British drama television series
BBC high definition shows
BBC television dramas
Television series by Endemol
2010s British crime television series
2010s British television miniseries
English-language television shows
Television series set in the 1940s
Television series set in the 1950s
Television shows set in London
Television shows set in Wales
Serial killers in television